Olivier Jacquet (born 27 June 1969) is a Swiss fencer. He competed in the individual épée events at the 1992 and 1996 Summer Olympics.

References

External links
 

1969 births
Living people
Swiss male épée fencers
Olympic fencers of Switzerland
Fencers at the 1992 Summer Olympics
Fencers at the 1996 Summer Olympics